In mathematics, the ring of modular forms associated to a subgroup  of the special linear group  is the graded ring generated by the modular forms of . The study of rings of modular forms describes the algebraic structure of the space of modular forms.

Definition
Let  be a subgroup of  that is of finite index and let  be the vector space of modular forms of weight .

Example

Properties
A bracket can be defined for the -th derivative of modular forms and such a bracket is called a Rankin–Cohen bracket.

Congruence subgroups of SL(2, Z)

In 2003, Lev Borisov and Paul Gunnells showed that the ring of modular forms  is generated in weight at most 3 when  is the congruence subgroup  of prime level  in  using the theory of toric modular forms.

Building on this work, in 2016, Aaron Landesman, Peter Ruhm, and Robin Zhang showed that the same bounds hold for the full ring (all weights), with the improved bounds of 5 and 10 when  has some nonzero odd weight modular form.

General Fuchsian groups
A Fuchsian group  corresponds to the orbifold obtained from the quotient  of the upper half-plane .

There is a general formula for the weights of generators and relations of rings of modular forms due to the work of Voight and Zureick-Brown and the work of Landesman, Ruhm, and Zhang.
If  has no nonzero odd weight modular forms, then the ring of modular forms is generated in weight at most  and has relations generated in weight at most . If  has a nonzero odd weight modular form, then the ring of modular forms is generated in weight at most  and has relations generated in weight at most .

Applications
In string theory and supersymmetric gauge theory, the algebraic structure of the ring of modular forms can be used to study the structure of the Higgs vacua of four-dimensional gauge theories with N = 1 supersymmetry.

References

Lie algebras
Modular forms
Number theory